Museum of Modern Glass Art is a museum dedicated to contemporary glass art in Odunpazarı, Eskişehir, Turkey.

The museum was established with the cooperation of Eskişehir Metropolitan Municipality, Anadolu University and a private group for friends of glass in 2007. Turkey's first museum of its kind, it exhibits works of 58 domestic and 10 foreign artists.

References

Museums in Eskişehir
Glass museums and galleries
Art museums and galleries in Turkey
Museums established in 2007
2007 establishments in Turkey
Odunpazarı